USS Locator (AGR/YAGR-6) was a , converted from a Liberty Ship, acquired by the US Navy in 1955. She was obtained from the National Defense Reserve Fleet and reconfigured as a radar picket ship and assigned to radar picket duty in the North Pacific Ocean as part of the Distant Early Warning Line.

Construction
Locator (YAGR-6) was laid down on 9 February 1945, under a Maritime Commission (MARCOM) contract, MC hull 2347, as the Liberty Ship Frank O. Peterson, by J.A. Jones Construction, Panama City, Florida. She was launched 23 March 1945, sponsored by Mrs. Evelyn Flynn, and delivered on 6 April 1945, to International Freigting Corp.

Service history
She was acquired by the Navy from the US Maritime Administration (MARAD) on 10 June 1955. She was converted to a radar picket ship at the Charleston Naval Shipyard, Charleston, South Carolina, and commissioned Locator on 21 January 1956.
 
Departing Charleston, 21 February, Locator steamed through the Panama Canal, and arrived San Francisco, California, 17 March. After a period of repair and training she was assigned to a radar picket station off the US West Coast. Coordinating operations with the Continental and North American Air Defense Commands, she detected, tracked, and reported all air contacts that came within her radar surveillance.
 
Locator was reclassified AGR-6 on 28 September 1958, and for the next 7 years continued the constant vigil at sea, ever ready to sound the signal of enemy air attack. Her operations at sea were alternated by in-port replenishment periods at San Francisco.

Decommissioning
After contributing 9 years to the defense of the United States. Locator decommissioned at San Francisco, 9 August 1965. Her name was struck from the Naval Register 1 September 1965, and was sold for scrapping, 4 January 1975.

Military awards and honors
Scanners crew was eligible for the following medals:
 National Defense Service Medal

References

Bibliography

External links 
 

 

Liberty ships
Ships built in Panama City, Florida
1945 ships
World War II merchant ships of the United States
Guardian-class radar picket ships
Cold War auxiliary ships of the United States
Hudson River Reserve Fleet